Lewis Ashenheim (1817 – 26 November 1858) was a Scottish physician and surgeon.

Biography
Lewis Ashenheim was born in Edinburgh to Jacob Ashenheim, a Dutch-born Jewish jeweller. He studied at the Universities of Edinburgh and St Andrews, graduating from the latter in 1839. He afterwards became a licentiate of the Royal College of Surgeons of Edinburgh. Ashenheim subsequently visited Paris, Berlin, and other European cities, acquiring professional experience. He practised for some time in London, lecturing frequently and being an active contributor to the Anglo-Jewish press. 

He immigrated to Jamaica in 1843 and settled in Kingston, where he practised till 1850, when he moved to Falmouth, a port on the north coast of Jamaica. In addition to his practise, and lectures more or less connected with his profession, he addressed the public, through the press, on sanitary reform and on compulsory vaccination, of which he was an able advocate. He edited the Jewish monthly Bikkure Hayam: The First Fruits of the West and the newspaper Daily Gleaner. At Falmouth he rendered valuable services during an outbreak of cholera.

Selected publications

References
 

1817 births
1858 deaths
Alumni of the University of Edinburgh
Alumni of the University of St Andrews
Fellows of the Royal College of Surgeons of Edinburgh
Jamaican Jews
Jamaican newspaper editors
Jewish physicians
Medical doctors from Edinburgh
Medical journalists
Scottish emigrants to Jamaica
Scottish Jews